Watson Country is the title of a recording by American folk music and country blues artists Doc Watson and Merle Watson, released in 1996.

This collection is taken from the albums Watson recorded for Flying Fish between 1980-1984. It contains two previously unreleased tracks: "Bye Bye Bluebelle/Smiles" and "Leaving London".

Reception

Writing for Allmusic, music critic Rick Anderson wrote of the album "It has the smooth Nashville production characteristic of his albums of the time, but that's not really a flaw — even if it takes some of the leather out of his playing, having a full backing band extends his appeal beyond the hillbilly curtain, and to many ears, that's a good thing... Doc recorded many albums in this style, but for newcomers this is a nice sampler of his middle years."

Track listing
 "Smoke, Smoke, Smoke" (Merle Travis, Tex Williams) – 2:49
 "Along the Road" (Dan Fogelberg) – 2:53
 "Sheeps in the Meadow/Stoney Fork" (Traditional) – 2:56
 "Blue Ridge Mountain Blues" (Traditional) – 2:55
 "California Blues" (Jimmie Rodgers) – 3:22
 "Down Yonder" (Traditional) – 2:24
 "Any Old Time" (Jimmie Rodgers) – 2:29
 "Bye Bye Bluebelle/Smiles" (Travis) – 2:15
 "Leaving London" (Tom Paxton) – 2:32
 "Red Rocking Chair" (Traditional, Watson) – 2:06
 "Black Pine Waltz" (Traditional) – 2:35
 "Freight Train Blues" (Traditional) – 2:48
 "Hobo Bill's Last Ride" (Jimmie Rodgers) – 3:47
 "Jailhouse Blues" (Sleepy John Estes) – 2:52
 "Sadie" (T. Michael Coleman, Byron Hill) – 2:31
 "Fisher's Hornpipe/Devil's Dream" (Traditional) – 1:45
 "Sittin' Here Pickin' the Blues" (Coleman, Watson) – 3:15
 "Gonna Lay Down My Old Guitar" (Alton Delmore, Rabon Delmore) – 2:32

Personnel
Doc Watson – vocals, guitar, harmonica
Merle Watson – guitar, dobro, banjo
T. Michael Coleman – bass, harmony vocals
Herb Pedersen – harmony vocals
Ron Tutt – drums
Gene Estes – percussion
Hank "Bones" Kahn – bones
Al Perkins – pedal steel guitar
Charlie Musselwhite – harmonica
Byron Berline – fiddle
Sam Bush – fiddle, mandolin
Pat McInerney – drums, percussion
Mark O'Connor – fiddle, mandolin
Tom Scott – clarinet
Joe Smothers – harmony vocals

References

External links
A Doc Watson discography

1996 compilation albums
Doc Watson compilation albums
Flying Fish Records albums